WJTO (730 AM) is an adult standards and oldies station licensed to Bath, Maine. WJTO is owned by Blue Jey Broadcasting Co. (Bob Bittner: 100% stockholder) and is a sister station to similarly owned WJIB in Cambridge, Massachusetts.

History
WJTO began broadcasting in September 1957 as WMMS ("Where Most of Maine is Served") under original owner Winslow T. Porter Sr.  The callsign was changed in 1964 to WJTO for "Where Jets Take Off" — a reference to nearby Brunswick Naval Air Station.

In the 1960s and ‘70s, WJTO, with studios located in downtown Bath, gave several Portland stations real competition. In 1971, the modern two-story building was constructed at the transmitter site (the current site owned by Bittner), and all was well until the late '70s when FM came into fashion. WJTO had a powerful FM (WJTO-FM), which later became WIGY-FM and WKRH-FM; all three incarnations co-owned with WJTO. With listenership drifting to FM, the original AM station was getting less attention, drifting through several ownership changes until both stations went into bankruptcy around 1990. Off the air for 11 months, the FM was finally sold to a Rhode Island broadcaster (which still owns it, with callsign changed to WBCI).

Bob Bittner
Bob Bittner bought WJTO in March 1997, as the fourth station under his ownership. (In 1996-7, he sold two of his other stations, WNEB in Worcester, Massachusetts, and WKBR in Manchester, New Hampshire.) Bittner uses the premises as a summer residence and keeps an extensive music collection for both stations at WJTO. On display at WJTO is much radio memorabilia, including many classic playlists from WABC during its "MusicRadio 77" days in the 1970s.

With Bittner's purchase in 1997, WJTO switched from talk to beautiful music with moderate results. Slowly, Bittner morphed it to an adult standards station with a lot of '50s/'60s oldies pop mixed in; in recent years, WJTO has had an audience equivalent to the prosperity days of the 1960s and 1970s.

Typical music heard on WJTO (and separately-programmed WJIB) includes a blend of music from 1937 to 1980 (with a few from before and after) not heard anywhere else on the mid- and southern coast of Maine, from Frank Sinatra to Linda Ronstadt. In addition to the hits, Bittner inserts about 4 LP tracks each hour, from same and similar artists. Amazingly, says Bittner, it all flows quite well.

Similar to Bittner's Boston station WJIB, WJTO does not air any commercials, but is big on local public service announcements, including fund-raising spots aimed at keeping the station on the air. WJTO's first fundraising drive in 2008 raised $29,676.11 from 657 different listeners (including a radio fan from Goshen, New York who actually hunted down Bob and the station after hearing it on vacation) over an eleven-week period that summer. Later fund-drives (contributions from listeners) in 2009, 2010 and 2011 were quite successful, thereby solidifying this method of support.  Having allegiance to the listeners, as opposed to commercial interests, allows WJTO to have what they call a "pro-people attitude" with public service announcements and editorial opinions rarely heard on other stations.

WJTO puts out a 1,000-watt daytime signal and can be heard as far away as Provincetown, Massachusetts, and Nova Scotia, with a daytime city-grade signal into Portland. (It also airs at night, but the signal doesn't get far with only six watts.)

Blue Jey Broadcasting has purchased translator W252BT in Freeport to rebroadcast WJTO and it became a licensed facility on May 8, 2013.

Translator

References

External links
A tour of the WJTO facility

FCC History Cards for WJTO

JTO
Adult standards radio stations in the United States
Oldies radio stations in the United States
Radio stations established in 1957
Bath, Maine
1957 establishments in Maine